The Hammer Historical Collection of Incandescent Electric Lamps (titled "The History of an Art") was an exhibit of early electric light bulbs and was collected by William Joseph Hammer. The collection of lamp bulbs is the most comprehensive known in the world. It shows the technology development of the filament electric light bulb during Thomas Edison's lifetime. Hammer's collection was displayed for years in five glass cases at the Headquarters of the American Institute of Electrical Engineers in New York City. It is now housed at The Henry Ford Museum in Dearborn, Michigan.

Description 

William Joseph Hammer started to collect incandescent light bulbs from 1879 while they were being developed in the Edison laboratory in Menlo Park, New Jersey. He was an associate of Thomas Edison and in his engineering career he was able to collect early filament electric light bulbs from Edison and others because of his association in the field. The Hammer collection is the most comprehensive collection of incandescent electric light bulbs known in the world. It shows the technology development of the filament electric light bulb during Thomas Edison's lifetime.

Hammer's incandescent light bulb collection from around the world was titled "The History of an Art" and he exhibited it at various times in electrical expositions and shows. He first exhibited it in 1882 at the International Electrical Exposition at the Crystal Palace in London and was awarded a silver medal for the presentation. When he presented his collection at the St. Louis World's Fair of 1904 he was awarded the Grand Prize.

Hammer was awarded the Elliott Cresson Gold Medal from the Franklin Institute for his collection in 1906. The General Electric Company bought the collection from Hammer in 1912 for $10,000. It then was donated to the Edison Association of Illuminating Companies. The collection was put into a formal display room in 1913 at the Headquarters of the American Institute of Electrical Engineers in New York City. The display information for each Case is how it existed in 1913 after Hammer had collected these light bulbs for 34 years. In 1931 the light bulb collection had an estimated value of over a million dollars.

Below are example close-ups of the electric lamps in the 1904-06 collection.

American Institute of Electrical Engineers 

The incandescent lamp collection of over a thousand antique electric light bulbs was displayed formally
for over ten years starting in 1913 at the Headquarters of the American Institute of Electrical Engineers in New York City. It was arranged in five glass cases at the end of a room in a large horseshoe shape. Two of the cases were on the back wall with one case each on the adjacent side walls. These cases each were ten feet in length. The cases were made of French plate clear glass and had glass shelves.  They had mirrors at the back to show the back side of the bulbs. In addition to these there was a fifth case in the center, which was four feet square. The cases were numbered 1 to 5 and displayed each a period of the evolution of the incandescent electric light bulb development. They showed on a label the country of origin, date, and inventor of each.

Hammer pointed out that Edison was not the first to make an electric light bulb. He claims instead that Edison made the first commercial electric light bulb that was successful. The other electric lamps made by others had inherent defects and burned out quickly, making them not practical for use to the general public. Edison first used various experimental vegetable fibers for the lamp filaments. One was a processed bamboo fiber used for a filament inside a glass bulb containing a vacuum. This was a filament of high resistance. Edison's electric lamp internal wire was unique in that the element had a resistance of around 140 ohms. There were several advantages to this, one being that several could be connected at the same time to a circuit. Others used filaments of low resistance ranging from 1 ohm to 5 ohms. This low resistance not only overloaded the electrical power system, but the wire filaments burned out quickly from extreme heat. They were impractical and expensive – not conducive to a commercial market.

Case 1 

Case No. 1 contained a selection of lamps that represented the basics of the technology involved in the early stages of the electric light bulb development. The case displayed actual physical light bulbs made by Thomas Edison and others from 1878 to 1883. Edison's earliest steps in the bamboo filament and graphite filament lamps are displayed in this case. The first lamp made in a pear shape was in this display, which was the universal shape for electric light bulbs for decades. These in this display case contained numbers that ranged from 1 – 109.

Case 2 

Case No. 2 contained lamps that showed the various stages of the development of the carbon filament lamp from 1878 to 1913. It supplemented Case #1 and showed date order of the technology. In this case were "stopper lamps" which Mr. Edison made as early as 1880. These lamps were originally numbered 110 to 357. The "stopper lamps" were made by others like Westinghouse, Packard, and Greene. This type of electric light bulb had the filament stem built into the neck of the glass bulb. This was purposefully designed this way to circumvent the Edison patents. Many of these lamps were used by the Westinghouse Electric Company for lights at the World's Fair of Chicago in 1893.  They represented the state of the art in incandescent electric lights from others that worked closely with Edison to advance this technology.

There were over 300 bulbs grouped in date sections in this case by such innovators as Alexander Bernstein, Charles de Changy, William Crookes, Alessandro Cruto, Hiram Stevens Maxim, St. George Lane Fox-Pitt, Alexander Lodygin, William E. Sawyer, Müller, William H. Akester, Henry E. Nothomb, L. H. Rogers, Joseph Swan, James Swinburne, Werner von Siemens, Ludwig K. Boehm, Greinert-Friederich, and Lewis Howard Latimer.

Case 3 

This Case further represented the development of the incandescent electric light bulb from the fundamental steps shown in Case #1. These electric lamps were from worldwide inventors that worked directly with Edison on ideas. The electric light bulbs were grouped chronologically from 1881 to 1904. Among these were some Diehl's induction lamps for use with alternating current. A description of how this technology worked is that of a secondary coil of wire was placed inside the bulb of a vacuum. The two ends of the coiled wire connected to the filament that was electrified and provided the light. A primary coil was wound on the outside of the glass bulb. This coil was connected to an alternating current electrical power supply. The secondary coil inside the bulb would receive this alternating magnetism from the primary coil and provide an electrical current that electrified the inside filament. Ultimately this type of alternating current technology never developed and was not used. Pictures of some of the lamps that were in this display are below. These were later numbered 358 to 536.

Case 4 
Case No. 4 further represented the development of the incandescent electric light bulb from the fundamental steps shown in Case No. 1 and Case No. 3. These lamps showed a time period of from 1893 to 1903 and included special regulating lamps, styles for advertising signs, and novelty lamps like those made for Christmas trees.

This case had a lamp and socket used by Hammer for the first electric sign ever made. It lit up the name EDISON letter by letter in sequence when a set of switches were turned on by hand – one at a time in order. It was constructed in December 1881 and hung up in 1882 at the Crystal Palace in London. The lamp bulbs in this case display were numbered 782 to 1031. Below are some of the incandescent electric lamps that were in this case.

Case 5 

Case No. 5 were light bulbs that represented the state of the art of filament lamps from 1900 to 1913. They show electric lights using certain gases within the sealed bulb. They were directing a path of technology into 'cold light.' One of these was a long tube instead of a globe. It had a stop cock in the center and a glass bulb at each end. Hammer explained how this one came about. He said one day in 1902 he visited Pierre Curie, the husband of Madam Curie. Professor Curie drew a diagram on the blackboard and suggested that Hammer make a lamp like that with sulfide of zinc inside. Curie explained to Hammer what radium gaseous could do in this configuration. It would stimulate luminescence that would produce light without a hot filament involved.

Lamps in this case also show how some of these experimental bulbs progressed into vacuum tubes that were used in radios and TVs. Below are some of the incandescent electric lamps that were in this display case. These were numbered 530 to 871.

Later history 
The Edison Association of Illuminating Companies gave the entire Hammer collection to Henry Ford in 1929 for his new museum in Dearborn, Michigan.  As of June 2000 they were still in the museum's collection.

References

Sources

External links 
 Some of the lamps at the Henry Ford museum

Works about Thomas Edison
Incandescent light bulbs
1882 introductions
The Henry Ford